Ben 10 is an American animated television series based on the 2005 series of the same name. The series premiered in Europe, Asia-Pacific, Middle East, and Africa in October 2016 and April 10, 2017 in the United States, and concluded on April 11, 2021. 178 episodes of the series aired over the course of four seasons, in addition to a film, Ben 10 Versus the Universe: The Movie, with the series finale serving as a multiversal crossover with all previous Ben 10 series.

Series overview

Episodes

Season 1 (2016–17)

Season 2 (2017–18) 
This season was first released across the EMEA region in October 2017. It premiered on:
 October 2 in Turkey
 October 3 in the UK and Ireland
 October 20 in Italy
 October 23 in Central and Eastern Europe, Germany, Netherlands and Flanders, Poland, Russia and Southeast Europe, and Sub-Saharan Africa
 October in France and the Nordic countries
 November 11 in Spain
 November 18 in Portugal.

It was released in the United States, Latin America and the Asia-Pacific in February 2018. It premiered on:
 February 3 in Australia, New Zealand, and the Philippines
 February 4 in Hispanic America and Brazil
 February 19 in the United States
 February 24 in Southeast Asia.

Crossover special (2018)

Season 3 (2019)

Season 4 (2019–20)

Film (2020) 
On February 19, 2020, Cartoon Network announced Ben 10 Versus The Universe: The Movie, a feature length movie based on the series.

Specials (2021)

Shorts 
These were shown alongside airings of the series. Each short shows Ben transforming into an alien (usually more than once) in order to accomplish a task.

Alien Worlds 
Alien World, also known as Alien of the Week or Alien Time, are a series of shorts that were released during Wednesday, starting on August 2, 2017 on Ben 10's YouTube channel. These videos shows aliens Ben can transform into, their home planets, and culture. The shorts are narrated by the character Azmuth. There have been 30 shorts so far.

Notes

References 

Lists of American children's animated television series episodes
Lists of Cartoon Network television series episodes
2010s television-related lists
2020s television-related lists
2016